Ellen R. Auster is a Professor of Strategic Management at the Schulich School of Business at York University in Ontario, Canada. She is also the Executive Director of York Change Leadership at York University and the co-founder of Stragility Change Management.

Education 
Auster received a B.A. from Colgate University and a PhD from Cornell University.

Career 
Auster is currently a Professor of Strategic Management at the Schulich School of Business, York University and the Executive Director of York Change Leadership at York University. At Schulich, Auster was the Founding Director of the Schulich Centre for Teaching Excellence. Auster also co-founded Stragility Change Management with Lisa Hillenbrand. Prior to joining York University, Auster was faculty at Columbia Business School and the Tuck School of Business.

Auster is the author of four books and has been published in numerous academic journals.

Personal life 
In 1989, Auster married business school professor Stephen E. Weiss. At the time, Weiss was at the New York University Stern School of Business.

Published books 

 Excellence in Business Teaching: A Quick Start Guide (McGraw-Hill Ryerson, 2004) - with Tina Grant and Krista Wylie
 Strategic Organizational Change (Palgrave Macmillan, 2005) - with Krista Wylie and Michaela Valente
 Bridging the Values Gap: How Authentic Organizations Bring Values to Life (Berrett-Koehler, 2015) - with R. Edward Freeman
 Stragility: Excelling at Strategic Changes (University of Toronto Press, 2016) - with Lisa Hillenbrand

References

External links 

 Ellen Auster at ResearchGate
 ER Auster at Google Scholar

Academic staff of York University
Colgate University alumni
Cornell University alumni
Columbia Business School faculty
Living people
Year of birth missing (living people)